Weert, Belgium may refer to:
Weert, Antwerp, Belgium
Weert, Limburg, Belgium